Notodonta is a genus of moths of the family Notodontidae erected by Ferdinand Ochsenheimer in 1810.

Selected species
Notodonta albicosta (Matsumura, 1920)
Notodonta dembowskii Oberthür, 1879
Notodonta dromedarius (Linnaeus, 1767)
Notodonta griseotincta Wileman, 1910
Notodonta jankowski Oberthür, 1879
Notodonta pacifica Behr, 1892
Notodonta roscida Kiriakoff, 1963
Notodonta scitipennis Walker, 1862
Notodonta torva (Hübner, 1803)
Notodonta torva simplaria Graef, 1881
Notodonta trachitso Oberthür, 1894
Notodonta tritophus (Denis & Schiffermüller, 1775)
Notodonta ziczac (Linnaeus, 1758)

References

Notodontidae